French military mission to Greece may refer to one of the following French military missions to train the Greek military:

Unofficial in 1828–1833, during the Morea expedition
French military mission to Greece (1884–1887)
French naval mission to Greece (1884–1890)
French military mission to Greece (1911–1914)
French military mission to Greece (1917–1923) under Antoine Gramat in World War I
French military mission to Greece (1925–1932)

See also
 British military mission to Greece (disambiguation)